Schönrock is a German surname. Notable people with the surname include:

Daron Schoenrock (born 1961), American baseball coach
Sybille Schönrock (born 1964), East German swimmer
Walter Schönrock (1912–1996), German long-distance runner

German-language surnames